Krofdorf-Gleiberg is a settlement in the Wettenberg municipality in Hesse, Germany.

Giessen (district)